Below are the names and numbers of the 23 LSWR O2 class locomotives that were transferred to the Isle of Wight. Another successful publicity campaign by the Southern Railway gave them names from 1925 onwards, representing places in the Island.

References

0-4-4T locomotives
O2 Class locomotives
O2
Rail transport on the Isle of Wight
Isle Of Wight Based O2 Class Locomotives